Walzer aus Wien ("Waltzes from Vienna," titled The Great Waltz in English) is a singspiel pasticcio in three acts, libretto by Alfred Maria Willner,  and Ernst Marischka, music by Johann Strauss II (son), arranged by Erich Wolfgang Korngold and Julius Bittner, first performed at the Stadttheater in Vienna on 30 October 1930.  An English musical theatre adaptation called The Great Waltz played on Broadway in 1934, and another English version played in London in 1970.

French and English versions
The libretto was translated into French by André Mouëzy-Éon and Jean Marietti, and first performed, under the title Valses de Vienne at the Théâtre de la Porte Saint-Martin in Paris on 21 December 1933. In the USA and Britain it was performed, with further re-arrangements of the music, as The Great Waltz.

Roles

Synopsis 
The action takes place in Vienna around 1845, and relates the rivalry between the Strausses, father and son, and the love of the young Rési for Strauss Jr., but with the help of a Russian Countess, father and son are reconciled and love triumphs.

Discography 
 Valses de Vienne - Thérèse Schmidt, Aimé Doniat, Lina Dachary, Rosine Brédy, Jean-Louis Simon - Chorus and Orchestra, Jean-Claude Hartemann - Véga (1962)
 Valses de Vienne - Mady Mesplé, Bernard Sinclair, Christiane Stutzmann, Pierre Bertin - Choeurs René Duclos, Orchestre de l'Opéra-Comique, Jean Doussard - EMI (1971)

Film 
Waltzes from Vienna, directed by Alfred Hitchcock (UK, 1934)

Sources 
 
Gänzl, Kurt (1992), 'Walzer aus Wien' in The New Grove Dictionary of Opera, ed. Stanley Sadie (London) 
 L'opéra, Pierre Brunel & Stéphane Wolff, (Bordas,1980) 

Singspiele
Operas
German-language operas